Hans James David Hamilton, 4th Baron HolmPatrick (born 15 March 1955), is a British peer and Labour politician.

Family
Lord HolmPatrick is the son of the late James Hans Hamilton, 3rd Baron HolmPatrick (1928–1991), and Anne Loys Roche Brass. The 3rd Lord HolmPatrick was the son of Hans Wellesley Hamilton, 2nd Baron HolmPatrick (1886–1942), and Lady Edina Conyngham (1888–1964), daughter of Henry Conyngham, 4th Marquess Conyngham (1857–1897). In turn, the 2nd Lord HolmPatrick was the son of Ion Trant Hamilton, 1st Baron HolmPatrick, and Lady Victoria Alexandria Wellesley. She was a daughter of the courtier Major-General Lord Charles Wellesley. Her paternal grandfather was the great British general Arthur Wellesley, 1st Duke of Wellington. She was also the elder sister of the 3rd and 4th Duke. She was granted the rank of a duke's daughter in 1884. The first Lord HolmPatrick was an MP and Irish civic leader.

The future Lord HolmPatrick married Gill Francesca Anne du Feu, the daughter of Squadron Leader Kenneth James (Toby) Harding, on 19 July 1984. The Hon. James Hans Stephen Hamilton (born 6 October 1982) is the heir incumbent to the barony.

Political career
Lord HolmPatrick was a Labour peer until 1999, when most of the hereditary peers were removed from the House of Lords by the House of Lords Act 1999. Lord HolmPatrick was not one of those 15 hereditary peers elected by the whole House nor one of those 2 peers elected by the Labour hereditary. In 2003 Lord HolmPatrick stood to be one of the Labour peers following the death of Michael Milner, 2nd Baron Milner of Leeds, but was defeated by Christopher Suenson-Taylor, 3rd Baron Grantchester.

References

Mosley, Charles, ed., Burke's Peerage, Baronetage and Knightage, 107th edition, London (2004) p. 1947.

1955 births
Living people
Barons in the Peerage of the United Kingdom
Labour Party (UK) hereditary peers
HolmPatrick